Lesbian, gay, bisexual, and transgender (LGBT) people in Piauí,  a  state of Brazil located in the country's Northeast Region enjoy  many of the same legal protections available to non-LGBT people. Homosexuality is legal in the state.

Recognition of same-sex marriages
On December 14, 2012, the Court of Piauí began granting same-sex couples marriage licenses through all notaries statewide, thus ending a long struggle for marriage equality in state. Now, couples do not need to have a judge's approval to get married. This change was published officially in the 'Diário de Justiça' of this state on December 17, 2012.

LGBT adoption

Laws against discrimination

Gender reassignment

References

Piaui
Piauí